Garudinodes bicolorana is a moth of the family Erebidae. It was described by George Thomas Bethune-Baker in 1908. It is found in Papua New Guinea.

References

 Natural History Museum Lepidoptera generic names catalog

Nudariina
Moths described in 1908